Terre Haute is an unincorporated community in Burrell Township, Decatur County, Iowa, United States.

References

Unincorporated communities in Decatur County, Iowa
Unincorporated communities in Iowa